Mike Jeffrey Keehn is an American college baseball coach and former shortstop. Keehn served as the head baseball coach of the North Alabama Lions (2009–2022).

Early life
Keehn attended Kearney High School in Kearney, Nebraska. Keehn then accepted a scholarship to attend Kearney State College. He played middle infield for the Lopers, where he was named an honorable mention NAIA All-American. Keehn was drafted by the Texas Rangers, and spend the end of the 1983 season as a member of the Tri-City Triplets.

Coaching career
In 1985, Keehn was named an assistant coach at Kansas City Kansas Community College. In 1988, Keehn became an assistant at the University of North Alabama. In the fall of 2008, Keehn was named the Head coach of the North Alabama Lions baseball program. On April 8, 2018, Keehn got his 300th win at North Alabama. Retired from coaching on 5/21/22.

Head coaching record

References

External links

North Alabama Lions bio

Living people
1961 births
Nebraska–Kearney Lopers baseball players
Tri-City Triplets players
North Alabama Lions baseball coaches
University of North Alabama alumni